Alysha Eveline Newman (born 29 June 1994) is a Canadian track and field athlete who specializes in the pole vault. She competed at the 2016 and 2020 Olympic Games.

Early life
Newman's first sport was gymnastics, which she was forced to abandon at the age of 13 after injuring a lower back vertebra. After one year off sports where she considered ice hockey and diving, she chose track and field, and was directed by a coach to vaulting due to her gymnastics background.

NCAA career
In 2013, Newman joined Eastern Michigan University, becoming the Mid-American Conference champion and competing in the NCAA tournament.

Afterwards, she transferred to the University of Miami, following her coach Jerel Langley. Newman graduated in 2016 with a major in exercise physiology and a minor in nutrition.

Newman successfully cleared  at the University of Miami's Hurricane Alumni Invitational on 9 April 2016, breaking the University of Miami school record, Atlantic Coast Conference (ACC) record, and Canadian national record in the women's pole vault. In June, Newman won the silver medal at the 2016 NCAA Division I Outdoor Track and Field Championships and finished her college career as a six-time NCAA Division I All-American.

Athletic career
Newman competed in the pole vault event at the 2014 Commonwealth Games, winning the bronze medal. The  vault ranked Newman fourth in the world in women's pole vault at that time.

In July 2016 she was officially named to Canada's Olympic team. Competing in the Olympics, Newman only vaulted  in qualification and missed the finals.

Newman competed at the first ever "Vault the Park", a street vault at Victoria Park during the annual Rib Fest in her hometown of London, Ontario. She successfully cleared , topping her own Canadian women's record.

Newman bettered her own national record again at the Hurricane Alumni Invitational at the University of Miami on 8 April 2017, where she vaulted  in Coral Gables, Florida. In August, she was a finalist at the 2017 World Championships in Athletics, finishing seventh by vaulting .

In March 2018, Newman placed sixth at the 2018 World Indoor Championships with a height of 4.70 m.

In May 2018, while traveling to compete at the Qatar Athletic Super Grand Prix in Doha, Newman's poles were all destroyed while in transit with Air Canada.  She competed at the event with poles borrowed from a local athletics club, placing seventh.  Air Canada subsequently replaced all of her equipment.  Newman then suffered a torn patellar tendon in a warmup at the Prefontaine Classic in Eugene, Oregon.

Competing at the 2019 Pan American Games in Lima, Newman won the bronze medal in the pole vault event, clearing . She expressed dissatisfaction with her performance, saying she "definitely felt that I underperformed." That mark ranked her as the #16 vaulter of all time. She duplicated 4.82 m while finishing third in the 2019 Diamond League meet in Zürich, where the women's pole vault was held one day earlier than the other events, indoors at the Zürich Hauptbahnhof. That jump ranked her tied for #12 all time indoors and is the Canadian record. Newman placed fifth at the pole vault event at the 2019 World Athletics Championships, clearing 4.80 m.

Newman was named to the Canadian team for the 2020 Summer Olympics, which the COVID-19 pandemic caused to be delayed to 2021. She suffered a concussion in early 2021, and did not participate in the 2021 Diamond League after failing to clear a bar at a tune-up event in Sweden. Upon arrival in Tokyo for the pole vault event, Newman failed to take off on all three of her attempts in the qualification round, and thus did not move on to the main phase of the competition. It was subsequently revealed that she had suffered a concussion in April, the ongoing symptoms of which plagued her for the remainder of the year. Eventually seeking additional medical assistance in October 2021, she began a new recovery regimen.

As her concussion recovery progressed, Newman spent time training at Athletics Canada's facility at York University. Proximity to Canadian heptathlete Georgia Ellenwood prompted her to experiment with multi-event training as well, and she competed for the first time since the Olympics in the heptathlon at the NACAC Combined Events Championship in Ottawa in May 2022. Newman finished fourth. Shortly afterward she won the Johnny Loaring Classic in Windsor with a vault of 4.61 m, 0.9 shy of the world standard. At the Canadian championships, Newman won the pole vault event and did well enough in the 100 metres hurdles to qualify for that team as well, though she did not qualify as a heptathlete. She failed to make the final in the pole vault event at the 2022 World Athletics Championships, clearing only 4.35 m. Initially depressed by the result, saying she was "not sure where to go from here because this sport continues to break my heart." After a few days, she opted to continue her season, saying that it was necessary to vocalize her disappointment but that she ultimately felt optimistic about her return to competing. Newman was named to the Canadian team for the 2022 Commonwealth Games in both the pole vault and 100 m hurdles, but an undiagnosed heel fracture hindered her performance. She withdrew from the vault midway through, placing sixth with a height of only 4.25 m, and did not compete in the hurdles, later announcing the end of her competition season.

Personal life
In October 2019, Newman and her boyfriend, Pittsburgh Steelers linebacker Anthony Chickillo, got into an altercation at Nemacolin Woodlands Resort in Fayette County, Pennsylvania. Chickillo was charged with simple assault, criminal mischief and harassment, while Newman was cited for harassment. Eventually, the charges against both were dropped. Newman was named one of Maxim's hot 100 women in 2021.

Results

NCAA

National

References

External links

 
 
  (archive)
 
 
 
 
 

1994 births
Living people
Athletes from London, Ontario
Canadian female pole vaulters
Athletes (track and field) at the 2016 Summer Olympics
Athletes (track and field) at the 2020 Summer Olympics
Olympic track and field athletes of Canada
Athletes (track and field) at the 2014 Commonwealth Games
Athletes (track and field) at the 2018 Commonwealth Games
Commonwealth Games gold medallists in athletics
Commonwealth Games gold medallists for Canada
Commonwealth Games bronze medallists for Canada
Athletes (track and field) at the 2019 Pan American Games
Medalists at the 2019 Pan American Games
Pan American Games medalists in athletics (track and field)
Pan American Games bronze medalists for Canada
Pan American Games track and field athletes for Canada
World Athletics Championships athletes for Canada
Miami Hurricanes women's track and field athletes
Eastern Michigan Eagles women's track and field athletes
Medallists at the 2014 Commonwealth Games
Medallists at the 2018 Commonwealth Games